Sprightly Island is an island 1 nautical mile (1.9 km) northwest of Spring Point in Hughes Bay, Graham Land. First roughly surveyed by the Belgian Antarctic Expedition (1897–99). Named by United Kingdom Antarctic Place-Names Committee (UK-APC) after the British sealer Sprightly, Captain Hughes, which visited this vicinity in 1824–25.

See also 
 List of Antarctic and sub-Antarctic islands

References 

Islands of Graham Land
Danco Coast